News9 Plus is an Indian news subscription-based over-the-top media service (OTT) service and news Production company, based out of Noida, India. It was launched by TV9 Network, who also own TV9 Telugu, TV9 Bharatvarsh, TV9 Kannada, TV9 Bangla, TV9 Marathi, and TV9 Gujarati, in February, 2022. It is helmed by Barun Das and the editor is Sandeep Unnithan.

TV9’s News9 Plus, an English video news magazine, is a separate app. It is the digital descendant of News9, the Network’s erstwhile English news channel based out of Bengaluru. It offers the depth and gravitas of news magazines but with the production qualities and story-telling techniques of OTT platforms. The CEO of Prasar Bharati, Shashi Shekhar Vempati called it the Future of News Industry.

The format of the episodes focuses on influencers from various fields. Some of the people to have featured are Bhaichung Bhutia, Vijay Deverakonda, Amitabh Kant, David Cameron, Hardeep Singh Puri, Arnab Goswami, media baron Subhash Chandra among many others.

Award Winning Shows

Notable Shows 

 Duologue With Barun Das
 The Big Kick Featuring Bhaichung Bhutia
 2023: The Take-off Year
 Killed by Taliban
 Small is Big
 Smart New World

See also 

 TV9 Telugu
 TV9 Bharatvarsh
 News9Live
 TV9 Kannada

References

Indian news websites